Egin is an unincorporated community in Fremont County, in the U.S. state of Idaho.

History
A post office called Egin was established in 1880, and remained in operation until 1907.  The name Egin reportedly means "cold" in an unidentified Native American language.

References

Unincorporated communities in Fremont County, Idaho